Roderic Dugald Morton Page (born 1962) is a New Zealand-born evolutionary biologist at the University of Glasgow, Scotland, and the author of several books.  he is professor at the University of Glasgow and was editor of the journal Systematic Biology until the end of 2007. His main interests are in phylogenetics, evolutionary biology and bioinformatics.

Education
Page was born in Auckland and earned a PhD in 1990 from the University of Auckland.

Career and research
Page is known for his work on co-speciation and in particular the development of bioinformatic software such as TreeMap, RadCon, and TreeView. Page is a co-author with Eddie Holmes of Molecular Evolution: A phylogenetic approach and editor of Tangled trees: phylogeny, cospeciation and coevolution.

Awards and honours
He received the Bicentenary Medal of the Linnean Society in 1998, and the Ebbe Nielsen Challenge joint first prize in 2018.

References

External links 

 

Academics of the University of Glasgow
New Zealand bioinformaticians
Evolutionary biologists
Living people
1962 births
Date of birth missing (living people)
People from Auckland
New Zealand expatriates in the United Kingdom
Academic journal editors
20th-century New Zealand scientists
21st-century New Zealand scientists
20th-century biologists
21st-century biologists